Kondotty Nercha is an ancient festival conducted every year at the Dargah of Kondotty Thangal in Malappuram District, Kerala, India.

Kondotty Thangal
Kondotty Nercha is conducted every year in memory of Kondotty Thangal alias Mohammed shah the Sufi exponent. His tomb constructed in the 18th century in Mughal style is located in Kondotty and it is known as the Kondotty Qubba.

Spring Festival
Kondotty Nercha is essentially a spring festival conducted in March or April every year. Once the harvest is over, the paddy fields of Kondotty are sufficiently empty and level enough to conduct a large scale local festival. A cannon is sounded to herald the beginning of the festival.

History
The Muslims of this area were formerly under the leadership of Ponnani Makhdoomis and the Sayed Sheik Jiffri. Mohammed Shah Thangal came to Kondotty from Mumbai in 1717. They became known as Kondotty Thangal family. A biography of the Thangal family is written by Areekkod Kunhava. The Thangal of Kondotty died in 1766. Kondotty Nercha is conducted every year at his tomb in Kondotty. There is another belief that Kondotty Nercha is conducted in memory of the Bagdad saint Abdhul Khader Jeelani.

The Rituals of the Festival
This festival is also known as Kondotty Pooram.
 Three big cannons will be shot at the paddy fields of Kondotty to herald the arrival of the festival.
 A white flag is hoisted at the Thangal junction in Kondotty to announce the peaceful nature of the festival.
 The first procession arriving at the Dargah is the Vellad procession from Perinthalmanna.
 Various enternatainments like Kolkkali, Songs and Dance are organized in the town.
 Another ritual is the cleaning of the guns of the Thangal palace. The leftover oil is believed to have medicinal values. A Hindu style lamp is also lighted during this occasion.
 The different processions from various villages come to Kondotty on different days.  All over the route villagers greet the procession with fireworks and festivities. 
 All the supporting villages join the festivities by making stalls for selling jilebis. Two kinds of jilebis are made: the white and expensive sugar jilebis and the black and cheaper jaggery jilebies

Distribution of Mareedha Sweet
The Mughal preparation Mareedha is distributed to the devotees at the end of the festival. Mareedha is a special sweet powder made of rice, ghee and various spices.

Goldsmith Box Procession

The culmination of the festival is the arrival of the Thattante Petti or the Goldsmith Box which is a procession of local merchants and devotees. This procession can include only neighboring villages of Kondotty. During this day, the Thangal of Kondotty comes on a horse and greets the devotees.

Kondotty Nercha has a secular tone as it is celebrated jointly by the Muslim and Hindu community of Kondotty. The last procession of the Goldsmith Box is usually managed by the Hindu traders of Kondotty.

Film on the Festival
A small group of students from GVHS School, Kondotty has made a short film on Kondotty Nercha. This 45 minute documentary film has become a local celebrity and won four state awards and a national award. The film shows the 100 year old history of the festival and more than 40 students participated in its making. The film was screened at Kerala State Children's Film Festival held at Kollam in Kerala. An eighth grade student called M.T.Shahama Bathool directed the film. The film is titled  ‘Nercha Oru Nerkazhcha'. Thousands of people attend the religious procession and fairs held during the festival.

Criticism
Some Muslim groups like the Mujahidhs and Jamaat-e-Islami are against the celebrations organized around Dargahs. They have organized partial boycott of the festival in recent years.

References

Festivals in Malappuram district